Bar Aftab-e Bozorg may refer to:
 Bar Aftab-e Fazl
 Bar Aftab-e Rezai